Apricorn may refer to:

Apricorn, Inc., a designer and manufacturer of computer storage products
A fruit in the Pokémon series